Marguerite Piazza (May 6, 1920 – August 2, 2012) was an American soprano, entertainer and philanthropist from New Orleans, Louisiana.

Early life 
In 1920, Piazza was born as Marguerite Clair Lucille Luft. Piazza's parents were Albert William Luft, Jr. (c. 1897–September 12, 1923) and Margherita (née Piazza; c. 1900–1958, later known as Margaret), who wed on January 24, 1917. Around 1927, Piazza's mother Margaret Luft wed Reuben Davis Breland, whose surname Marguerite adopted.

Education 
In 1940, Piazza earned a degree from Loyola University of the South's College of Music. Piazza attended Louisiana State University, where she was a student of the baritone Pasquale Amato.

Career 
Piazza was the first  Queen of the Krewe of Virgilians during Mardi Gras in her native New Orleans.

In 1944, she joined the New York City Opera, and was the youngest member of the company. Her first role was Nedda in Pagliacci, and in subsequent seasons appeared in La bohème (as Musetta), Der Zigeunerbaron, Don Giovanni (as Donna Elvira, in Theodore Komisarjevsky's production), and Amelia al ballo (as Amelia). She made her first appearance with the New Orleans Opera Association in Martha (in 1945), followed by Hänsel und Gretel (as Gretel), as well as the title role in Il segreto di Susanna. In 1950, Piazza made her Broadway debut, in Happy as Larry, with Burgess Meredith directing and starring in the title rôle, and Alexander Calder designing. 

As a result of that production, the soprano was invited to join the cast of the NBC television program Your Show of Shows, which starred Sid Caesar and Imogene Coca (1950–54). She made her debut at the Metropolitan Opera in 1951, as Rosalinde von Eisenstein in Die Fledermaus. Following the end of Your Show of Shows, she embarked on a career in supper and night clubs, bringing her further acclaim as an entertainer. 

Piazza's personal papers are archived at Loyola University New Orleans.

During the nineteen-fifties, Piazza was a paid spokeswoman for Camel cigarettes. In the 1960s she endured three melanoma-related operations, and in the 1970s was treated successfully for uterine cancer. In 1971, the soprano was honored by then President Richard M. Nixon for her courage in fighting the disease.

She performed and was a noted philanthropist in her adopted hometown of Memphis, where she was a longtime supporter of St. Jude Children's Research Hospital. She sang the national anthem at no fewer than twenty-seven Liberty Bowl football games.

Piazza was celebrated for her extensive efforts regarding various charities, especially the annual Marguerite Piazza Gala. On January 15, 1973, the Willis Music Company published Marguerite Piazza's Christmas Carol Sing-Along Party. Piazza's autobiography (co-authored with her daughter, Marguerite Bonnett), Pagliacci Has Nothing on Me!, was published in 2007.  Piazza was inducted into the Memphis Music Hall of Fame in 2016, becoming the first opera singer to be honored by the organization.

Personal life
On the advice of Armando Agnini, she adopted her mother's maiden name (Piazza) professionally.

Piazza was married four times. She was widowed three times and divorced once. She had six children; one of her sons died by suicide. Marguerite Piazza died in Memphis, Tennessee, on August 2, 2012, aged 92, from congestive heart failure, and was survived by her five children and large extended family.

References

Additional sources 
 Marshall, Keith. (2013), The Devil Made Her: Opera Star Marguerite Piazza and the Virgilians,  The "Mardi Gras Guide" (pamphlet).

External links

 
 
 Marguerite Piazza Collection at the Great American Songbook Foundation
 Marguerite Piazza Papers at Loyola University New Orleans

1920 births
2012 deaths
American operatic sopranos
American people of Italian descent
American television personalities
American women television personalities
Musicians from New Orleans
Writers from New Orleans
Writers from Tennessee
Musicians from Memphis, Tennessee
Loyola University New Orleans alumni
Louisiana State University alumni
Singers from Louisiana
21st-century American women